Tymbarcha is a genus of moths belonging to the subfamily Tortricinae of the family Tortricidae. It consists of two species.

Species
Tymbarcha cerinopa Meyrick, 1908
Tymbarcha translucida Diakonoff, 1941

See also
List of Tortricidae genera

References

External links
tortricidae.com

Tortricini
Tortricidae genera